Captured in Chinatown is a 1935 American film directed by Elmer Clifton.

Cast 
Tarzan (the police dog) as Tarzan
Marion Shilling as Ann Parker
Charles Delaney as Bob Martin
Philo McCullough as Raymond
Paul Ellis as Zamboni
Robert Walker as Harry, Henchman
Bobby Nelson as Bobby, Newsboy
John Elliott as Butler, City Editor
Bo Ling as Joy Ling
James B. Leong as Wong
Wing Foo as Tom Wong
Paul C. Fong as Lieu Ling

References

External links

1935 films
American mystery films
American crime films
American romance films
1930s English-language films
American black-and-white films
1930s mystery films
1930s crime films
1930s romance films
Films directed by Elmer Clifton
1930s American films